The following is a list of all team-to-team transactions that have occurred in the National Hockey League during the 2002–03 NHL season.  It lists what team each player has been traded to, signed by, or claimed by, and for which players or draft picks, if applicable.

May 

 This pick will go to the Calgary Flames as the result of a trade with Montreal on June 23, 2002.

June (Pre Draft Day) 

 This pick was previously acquired by Washington as the result of a trade on March 19, 2002, that sent Adam Oates to Philadelphia in exchange for Maxime Ouellet, this pick and Philadelphia's 2nd and 3rd round picks in the 2002 NHL Entry Draft.
 This pick was previously acquired by Philadelphia as the result of a trade on July 31, 2001, that sent Andy Delmore to Nashville in exchange for this pick.
 This pick will go to the Buffalo Sabres as the result of a trade with Columbus on June 22, 2002.
 This pick was previously acquired by Dallas as the result of a trade on March 19, 2002, that sent Jamie Langenbrunner and Joe Nieuwendyk to New Jersey in exchange for Jason Arnott, Randy McKay and this pick.
 This pick will go to the Dallas Stars as the result of a trade with Tampa Bay on June 22, 2002.
 This pick was previously acquired by Philadelphia as the result of a trade on June 23, 2001, that sent Philadelphia's 1st round pick in the 2001 NHL Entry Draft exchange for Ottawa's 1st round pick in the 2001 NHL Entry Draft, 7th round pick in the 2001 NHL Entry Draft and this pick.
 This pick was previously acquired by Ottawa as the result of a trade on June 30, 1999, that sent Andreas Johansson and the rights to sign Rick Dudley as GM to Tampa Bay in exchange for Rob Zamuner and a conditional pick in 2000, 2001 or this pick.
 This pick will go to the San Jose Sharks as the result of a trade with Tampa Bay on June 22, 2003.
 This pick was previously acquired by Philadelphia as the result of a trade on July 1, 2001, that sent Daymond Langkow to Phoenix in exchange for this pick and Phoenix's 1st round picks in the 2003 NHL Entry Draft.

June (NHL Entry Draft - Day 1) 

 This pick will go to the Detroit Red Wings as the result of a trade with Nashville on June 22, 2002.
 This pick was previously acquired by Anaheim as the result of a trade on March 5, 2002, that sent Marty McInnis to Boston in exchange for this pick.
 This pick will go to the Buffalo Sabres as the result of a trade with Atlanta on June 22, 2002.
 This pick was previously acquired by Florida as the result of a trade on May 31, 2001, that sent Alex Auld to Vancouver in exchange for Vancouver's 2nd round pick in the 2001 NHL Entry Draft and this pick.
 This pick was previously acquired by Florida as the result of a trade on March 18, 2002, that sent Pavel Bure and Florida's 2nd round pick in the 2002 NHL Entry Draft to the New York Rangers in exchange for Filip Novak, Igor Ulanov, Rangers' 1st round and 2nd round pick in the 2002 NHL Entry Draft and this pick.
 This pick was previously acquired by Florida as the result of a trade on March 18, 2002, that sent Pavel Bure and Florida's 2nd round pick in the 2002 NHL Entry Draft to the New York Rangers in exchange for Filip Novak, Igor Ulanov, Rangers' 2nd round pick in the 2002 NHL Entry Draft, 3rd round pick in the 2003 NHL Entry Draft and this pick.
 This pick will go to the Montreal Canadiens as the result of a trade with Calgary on June 23, 2002.
 This pick was previously acquired by Columbus as the result of a trade on June 18, 2002, that sent Ron Tugnutt and Columbus' 2nd round pick in the 2002 NHL Entry Draft to Dallas in exchange for this pick.
 This pick was previously acquired by Dallas as the result of a trade on March 19, 2002, that sent Jamie Langenbrunner and Joe Nieuwendyk to New Jersey in exchange for Jason Arnott, Randy McKay and this pick.
 This pick will go to the Atlanta Thrashers as a result of a trade with Columbus on June, 22, 2002.
 This pick was previously acquired by Buffalo as the result of a trade on June 30, 2001, that sent Dominik Hasek to Detroit in exchange for Vyacheslav Kozlov, this pick and a conditional pick in the 2003 NHL Entry Draft.
 This pick was previously acquired by Atlanta as the result of a trade on June 22, 2002, that sent Atlanta's 2nd round and 3rd round pick in the 2002 NHL Entry Draft to Buffalo in exchange for Vyacheslav Kozlov and this pick.
 This pick was previously acquired by Atlanta as the result of a trade on March 19, 2002, that sent Jiri Slegr to Detroit in exchange for Yuri Butsayev and this pick.
 This pick was previously acquired by Columbus as the result of a trade on June 22, 2002, that sent Columbus' 1st round pick in the 2002 NHL Entry Draft to Buffalo in exchange for this pick and the rights to Mike Pandolfo.
 This pick was previously acquired by Buffalo as the result of a trade on June 30, 2002, that sent Dominik Hasek to Detroit in exchange for Vyacheslav Kozlov, this pick and a conditional pick in the 2003 NHL Entry Draft.
 This pick will go to the Edmonton Oilers as a result of a trade with Buffalo on June, 22, 2002.
 This pick was previously acquired by Atlanta as the result of a trade on June 22, 2002, that the Thrashers promised not to draft Jay Bouwmeester #2 overall in the 2002 NHL Entry Draft to Florida in exchange for this pick and Florida's 4th round pick in the 2003 NHL Entry Draft.
 This pick was previously acquired by Florida as the result of a trade on May 31, 2001, that sent Alex Auld to Vancouver in exchange for Vancouver's 2nd round pick in the 2001 NHL Entry Draft and this pick.
 This pick will go to the Columbus Blue Jackets as a result of a trade with Atlanta on June, 22, 2002.
 This pick will go to the Edmonton Oilers as a result of a trade with Buffalo on June, 22, 2002.
 This pick will go to the Toronto Maple Leafs as a result of a trade with Nashville on June, 22, 2002.
 This pick was previously acquired by Buffalo as the result of a trade on June 22, 2002, that sent Vyacheslav Kozlov and Buffalo's 2nd round pick in the 2001 NHL Entry Draft to Atlanta in exchange for this pick and Atlanta's 3rd round pick in the 2002 NHL Entry Draft.
 This pick was previously acquired by Buffalo as the result of a trade on June 22, 2002, that sent Buffalo's 3rd round 2002 NHL Entry Draft and 2nd round pick in the 2003 NHL Entry Draft to Nashville in exchange for this pick.
 This pick was previously acquired by Tampa Bay as the result of a trade on June 21, 2002, that sent Tampa Bay's 1st round pick in the 2002 NHL Entry Draft to Philadelphia in exchange for Ruslan Fedotenko, this pick and Philadelphia's 2nd round pick in the 2002 NHL Entry Draft.
 This pick was previously acquired by Philadelphia as the result of a trade on June 23, 2001, that sent Philadelphia's 1st round pick in the 2001 NHL Entry Draft to Ottawa in exchange for Ottawa's 1st round and 7th round pick in the 2001 NHL Entry Draft and this pick.
 This pick was previously acquired by Ottawa as the result of a trade on June 30, 1999, that sent Andreas Johansson and the right to sign Rick Dudley as GM to Tampa Bay in exchange for Rob Zamuner and this pick.
 This pick was previously acquired by Tampa Bay as the result of a trade on June 21, 2002, that sent Tampa Bay's 1st round  pick in the 2002 NHL Entry Draft to Philadelphia in exchange for Ruslan Fedotenko, Philadelphia's 2nd round pick in the 2002 NHL Entry Draft and this pick.
 This pick was previously acquired by Philadelphia as the result of a trade on July 1, 2001, that sent Daymond Langkow to Phoenix in exchange for this pick and Phoenix's 1st round pick in the 2003 NHL Entry Draft.
 This pick was previously acquired by the New York Islanders as the result of a trade on June 23, 2001, that sent the Islanders' 3rd round pick in the 2001 NHL Entry Draft to Florida in exchange for Florida's 4th round pick in the 2001 NHL Entry Draft and this pick.
 This pick was previously acquired by Nashville as the result of a trade on June 22, 2002, that sent Nashville's 2nd round in the 2002 NHL Entry Draft to Buffalo in exchange for this pick and Buffalo's 3rd round pick in the 2003 NHL Entry Draft.
 This pick was previously acquired by Philadelphia as the result of a trade on June 24, 2001, Philadelphia's 4th round pick in the 2001 NHL Entry Draft to Carolina in exchange for this pick.
 This pick was previously acquired by Nashville as the result of a trade on June 22, 2002, with Anaheim for future considerations (Predators agreed not to select Joffrey Lupul in the 2002 NHL Entry Draft in exchange for this pick.
 This pick was previously acquired by Anaheim as the result of a trade on March 5, 2002, that sent Marty McInnis to Boston in exchange for this pick.
 This pick was previously acquired by Minnesota as the result of a trade on June 25, 2000, that sent Brad Lukowich, Minnesota's 1st round and 9th round pick in the 2001 NHL Entry Draft to Dallas in exchange for Aaron Gavey, Pavel Patera, Dallas' 8th round pick in the 2000 NHL Entry Draft and this pick.
 This pick was previously acquired by Dallas as the result of a trade on June 12, 2000, that sent Manny Fernandez and Brad Lukowich to Minnesota in exchange for Minnesota's 3rd round pick in the 2000 NHL Entry Draft and this pick.
 This pick will go to the New York Rangers as a result of a trade with San Jose on June, 22, 2003.

June (NHL Entry Draft - Day 2) 

 This pick will go to the Tampa Bay Lighting as the result of a trade with Pittsburgh on May 12, 2003.
 This pick was previously acquired by Calgary as the result of a trade on June 22, 2002, that sent Calgary's 1st round pick in the 2002 NHL Entry Draft to Florida in exchange for Florida's 1st round pick in the 2002 NHL Entry Draft and this pick.
 This pick was previously acquired by Montreal as the result of a trade on May 24, 2002, that sent Chris Dyment to Minnesota in exchange for this pick.
 This pick was previously acquired by Carolina as the result of a trade on May 31, 2000, that sent Paul Ranheim to Philadelphia in exchange for this pick.
 This pick was previously acquired by Philadelphia as the result of a trade on December 17, 2001, that sent Jan Hlavac and Philadelphia's 3rd round pick in the 2002 NHL Entry Draft to Vancouver in exchange for Donald Brashear and this pick.
 This pick was previously acquired by Atlanta as the result of a trade on June 24, 2001, that sent Atlanta's 3rd round pick in the 2002 NHL Entry Draft to New Jersey in exchange for New Jersey's 4th round pick in the 2001 NHL Entry Draft and this pick.

June (Post Draft Day) 

 This pick will go to the Minnesota Wild as the result of a trade with Toronto on June 21, 2002.

July

August

September

October 

 This pick will go to the Dallas Stars as the result of a trade with Atlanta on March 11, 2003.
 This pick will go to the New York Islanders as the result of a trade with Edmonton on March 11, 2003.
 This pick was previously acquired by Washington as the result of a trade on November 10, 2001, that sent Trevor Linden and a conditional 2nd round pick in the 2002 NHL Entry Draft to Vancouver in exchange for Vancouver's 1st round pick in the 2002 NHL Entry Draft and this pick.
 This pick will be traded from Florida to Chicago on June 22, 2003
 This pick will go to the San Jose Sharks as the result of a trade with Chicago on June 22, 2003.

November 

 This pick was previously acquired by Florida as the result of a trade on March 19, 2002, that sent Darren Van Impe  to the New York Islanders in exchange for this pick.

December

January 

 This pick will be traded from the New York Rangers to Boston on January 17, 2003
 This pick will go to the San Jose Sharks as the result of a trade with Boston on June 26, 2004.
 This pick will go to the Dallas Stars as the result of a trade with Chicago on November 17, 2003.
 This pick will go to the San Jose Sharks as the result of a trade with Boston on June 26, 2004.
 This pick will go to the Washington Capitals as the result of a trade with Ottawa on June 20, 2003.
 This pick will go to the San Jose Sharks as the result of a trade with Boston on June 26, 2004.
 This pick will go to the Los Angeles Kings as the result of a trade with Montreal on June 26, 2004.

February

March 1–10

March 11 - trade deadline 

Transactions
National Hockey League transactions